Trojan Dub Massive: Chapter One is a remix album by American composer Bill Laswell, released on March 8, 2005 by Trojan Records.

Track listing

Personnel 
Adapted from the Trojan Dub Massive: Chapter One liner notes.

Bill Laswell – remixing
Robert Musso – engineering
James Dellatacoma – assistant engineer
Michael Fossenkemper – mastering
Alex Theoret – mastering
John Brown – cover art

Charts

Release history

References

External links 
 Trojan Dub Massive: Chapter One at Bandcamp
 

2005 remix albums
Bill Laswell remix albums
Trojan Records remix albums